Below is a list of notable Turkish academics.

A
 Daron Acemoğlu
 Tülay Adalı
 Halide Edib Adıvar
 Erhan Afyoncu
 Mehmet Aga-Oglu
 Zeynep Ahunbay
 Şükrü Halûk Akalın
 Ali Akansu
 Selman Akbulut
 Taner Akçam
 Ali Akdemir
 Yalçın Akdoğan
 Mustafa Akgül
 Derya Akkaynak
 Fevzi Aksoy
 Muammer Aksoy
 İrşadi Aksun
 Ekrem Akurgal
 Mete Akyol
 Türkan Akyol
 Fikri Alican
 Ahmet Alkan
 Ahmet Vefik Alp
 Sedat Alp
 Mehmet Altan
 İhsan Oktay Anar
 Oya Araslı
 Cahit Arf
 Erdal Arıkan
 Engin Arık
 Attila Aşkar
 Tomur Atagök
 Abdullah Atalar
 Toktamış Ateş
 Mehmet Aydın
 Mustafa Aydın
 Lale Aytaman
 Orhan Aytür

B
 Özalp Babaoğlu
 Ali Bardakoğlu
 Aykut Barka
 Asım Orhan Barut
 Tamer Başar
 Süheyl Batum
 Deniz Baykal
 Turhan Baytop
 Murat Belge
 Nihat Berker
 Halil Berktay
 Behice Boran
 Korkut Boratav
 Naci Bostancı
 Metin Boşnak
 Aydın Boysan
 Ali Bozer
 Erdoğan Büyükkasap

C, Ç
 Simten Cosar
 Muazzez İlmiye Çığ
 Ümit Cizre
 Tansu Çiller
 Abdullah Cevdet
 Fikri Cantürk
 Halet Çambel

D
 Canan Dağdeviren
 Ahmet Davutoğlu
 Vedat Demir
 Tekin Dereli
 Selim Deringil
 Sıraç Dilber
 Ömer Diler
 Güzin Dino
 İhsan Doğramacı
 Burhanettin Duran

E
 Volkan Ş. Ediger
 Ekrem Buğra Ekinci
 Nazım Ekren
 Osman Nuri Eralp
 Necmettin Erbakan
 Aytül Erçil
 Kayhan Erciyeş
 Ali Erdemir
 Nevnihal Erdoğan
 Turhan Erdoğan
 Tunç Erem
 Kazım Ergin
 Ahmed Cemal Eringen
 Elza Erkip
 Veysel Eroğlu
 Okan Ersoy
 Uğur Ersoy
 Semavi Eyice

F 
 Metin Feyzioğlu
 Turhan Feyzioğlu

G
 Erol Gelenbe
 Mehmet Görmez
 Kemal Gözükara
 Nermin Gözükırmızı
 Birgül Ayman Güler
 Nuriye Gülmen
 Erol Güngör
 Levent Gürel
 Aydın Güven Gürkan
 Feza Gürsey
 Reşit Süreyya Gürsey
 Yaprak Gürsoy

H
Yusuf Halaçoğlu
Talât Sait Halman
M. Şükrü Hanioğlu
Remziye Hisar

I, İ 
Ahmet Mete Işıkara
Ekmeleddin İhsanoğlu
Ataç İmamoğlu
Afet İnan
Mustafa İnan
Umran İnan
Kemal Inat
Erdal İnönü
Bülent İplikçioğlu
Emrullah İşler

K 
Bedri Karafakıoğlu
Atilla Karaosmanoğlu
İbrahim Kavrakoğlu
Fuat Köprülü
Behram Kurşunoğlu
Şule Kut

M 
Seha Meray
Janet Akyüz Mattei
Uğur Mumcu

N
Nesrin Nas
Salih Neftçi
Leyla Neyzi

O, Ö 
F. Tulga Ocak
Sıddık Sami Onar
Lale Orta
İlber Ortaylı
Ekmel Özbay
Hasan Özbekhan
Tahsin Özgüç
Yaşar Nuri Öztürk

P
Necla Pur

R 
Oskar Rescher
Nükhet Ruacan

S, Ş 
Aziz Sancar
Aydın Sayılı
Türkan Saylan
Oktay Sinanoğlu
Tarık Galip Somer
Halil Mete Soner
Ayşe Soysal
Ibrahim Sirkeci
Mümtaz Soysal
B. Mutlu Sumer
Elif Şafak
Celâl Şengör
Hikmet Şimşek
Mehmet Şimşek
Ahmet Şimşirgil

T 
Hikmet Tanyu
Tosun Terzioğlu
Semih Tezcan
Erdoğan Teziç
Beğlan Birand Toğrol
Mehmet Toner
Hıfzı Topuz
İlter Turan
Cavit Orhan Tütengil

U, Ü 
Galip Ulsoy
Bilge Umar
Nermin Abadan Unat
Bahriye Üçok
Besim Üstünel

Y 
Nur Yalman
Serap Yazıcı
K. Aslihan Yener

 
Academics
Lists of Turkish people